Capsella orientalis is a plant species described by Mikhail Vasilevich Klokov. Capsella orientalis is a part of the genus Capsella, and the family Brassicaceae.

References

orientalis
Plants described in 1926